General elections were held in Bolivia on 2 May 1925, electing a new President of the Republic. However, the results of the election were annulled.

Results

President

References

1925 05
Bolivia
Legislative election
1925 05
1925